Neope pulahina, the scarce labyrinth, is a nymphalid butterfly found in India and South Asia.

References

Elymniini
Butterflies of Asia